Ladrovići   is a village in Croatia. 
   The name Ladrovići finds its etymological roots in the Italian word ladro meaning thief or burglar.

Populated places in Istria County